Siddhartha Nagar is an eastern suburb of Mysore city in Karnataka, a south Indian state.

Location
Siddhartha Nagar spans Bannur Road, Teresian College Road, and surrounding areas. The Bannur Road Junction on the Ring Road is the centre of the whole suburb.  This is considered an expensive suburb of Mysore because many upmarket hotels and residential apartments are located here. WARD: 53(KURUBAARA HALLI) KRISHNARAJA CONSTITUENCY

Post offices
Siddarthanagar post office has the pincode Mysore-570011, and another post office with the same pincode is located at Administrative Training Institute.

Landmarks
 Chamundi Vihar Stadium
 Vidya Vikas Engineering College
 Teresian First Grade College
 JSS Public School
 Rajasekhar Hospital
 Lalithamahal palace hotel
 Mysore Zoo Gardens
 Mysore Race Course
 Jockey Quarters
 Administrative Training Institute
 Karinji Lake and Gardens
 Police Training Grounds
 State Institute of Rural Development

Image gallery

See also
 Kalyanagiri
 Mysore Zoo
 Sathgulli
 Karanji Lake
 Raghavendra Nagar
 Administrative Training Institute, Mysore

References

Suburbs of Mysore